Pawn Shop is the debut studio album by American country music duo Brothers Osborne. It was released on January 15, 2016 via EMI Nashville. It includes the singles "Stay a Little Longer", "21 Summer", and "It Ain't My Fault".

Content
Both members of the duo (John and T.J. Osborne) co-wrote nearly every song on the album, except "Heart Shaped Locket", on which only TJ was a co-writer. Jay Joyce produced the album except for "Rum" and "Heart Shaped Locket", which the duo produced with Brad Hill. Both "Rum" and "Stay a Little Longer" previously appeared on their self-titled EP, although the latter was re-recorded. "Rum" was originally issued as a single off the EP in 2014, followed by the re-recording of "Stay a Little Longer" as the lead single from Pawn Shop. "21 Summer" and "It Ain't My Fault" were the album's second and third singles.

Critical reception
Rating it 4 out of 5 stars, Allmusic critic Stephen Thomas Erlewine felt that the album's sound combined modern and traditional country influences, staying that "Sanded and varnished though they may be, the pair feel fresh, their chemistry easy and natural, so they pull off their spiffy retroact with style." Jeffrey B. Remz of Country Standard Time made note of Southern rock and outlaw country influences in the sound, while also comparing T.J.'s voice to that of Trace Adkins. His review highlighted the lyrics to "It Ain't My Fault" and the instrumentation of "Stay a Little Longer", concluding that there were "no weak songs". Markos Papadatos of Digital Journal rated it "A−", calling it "a well-crafted project from start to finish" and praising the songwriting and arrangement of the singles in particular.

Commercial performance 
The album debuted at No. 3 on the Top Country Albums album, and No. 17 on the Billboard 200, selling 21,000 copies in its first week. It sold a further 6,100 copies in its second week.  The album was certified Gold on November 16, 2017. It has sold 237,100 copies in the US as of October 2019.

Accolades

Track listing

Personnel 
From Pawn Shop liner notes.

Brothers Osborne
 John Osborne - autoharp, banjo, bass guitar, 12-string guitar, acoustic guitar, baritone guitar, electric guitar, mandolin, pedal steel guitar, percussion, background vocals
 T.J. Osborne - acoustic guitar, percussion, lead vocals

Additional Musicians
 Adam Box - drums, percussion 
 Rich Brinsfield - bass guitar, upright bass
 Dave Cohen - Hammond B-3 organ, piano
 Ian Fitchuk - Hammond B-3 organ, percussion, Wurlitzer electric piano
 Jon Green - acoustic guitar
 Lee Holland - acoustic guitar, percussion 
 Jay Joyce - acoustic guitar, electric guitar, Hammond B-3 organ, percussion, piano
 Rachel Loy - bass guitar
 Josh Matheny - lap steel guitar
 Natalie Osborne - background vocals on "21 Summer"
 Lucie Silvas - background vocals on "It Ain't My Fault" and "21 Summer"
 Pete Sternberg - bass guitar, bass pedals, background vocals on "21 Summer"
 Lee Ann Womack - background vocals on "Loving Me Back"

Technical
Brad Hill - producer ("Rum" and "Heart Shaped Locket" only)
Brothers Osborne - producer ("Rum" and "Heart Shaped Locket" only)
Jay Joyce - producer (all tracks except "Rum" and "Heart Shaped Locket")

Chart performance

Weekly charts

Year-end charts

References 

2016 debut albums
Brothers Osborne albums
EMI Records albums
Albums produced by Jay Joyce